Peter Novajovský (born 27 September 1989) is a Slovak professional ice hockey player who currently playing for MHk 32 Liptovský Mikuláš of the Slovak Extraliga.

Career
Novajovský made his senior debut for HC Slovan Bratislava during the 2007–08 Slovak Extraliga season. He also played for KS Cracovia and GKS Tychy of the Polska Hokej Liga.

Career statistics

Regular season and playoffs

International

References

External links

Living people
Slovak ice hockey defencemen
1989 births
HC Slovan Bratislava players
Hokej Šumperk 2003 players
HC Vrchlabí players
HC ZUBR Přerov players
HK Spišská Nová Ves players
HC '05 Banská Bystrica players
HKM Zvolen players
HK Dukla Trenčín players
MKS Cracovia (ice hockey) players
GKS Tychy (ice hockey) players
HK Poprad players
Ice hockey people from Bratislava
MHk 32 Liptovský Mikuláš players
Slovak expatriate ice hockey players in the Czech Republic
Slovak expatriate sportspeople in Poland
Expatriate ice hockey players in Poland